Ron Pretty  (born 1940) is an Australian poet, publisher and teacher.

Early life
Ron Pretty was born in 1940.

Career
He has taught writing in the University of Wollongong and Melbourne University as well as in schools, colleges and a broad variety of community organisations. For a twenty-year period he ran Five Islands Press, publishing some 230 books of poetry and mentored many Australian poets. He edited the magazines Scarp: New Arts and Writing and Blue Dog: Australian Poetry for a number of years.

Pretty was instrumental in establishing the Poetry Australia Foundation, which led to the Australian Poetry Centre, one of two organisations which merged in 2011 to form Australian Poetry.

Recognition
He was awarded the NSW Premier's Award for Poetry and was made a Member of the Order of Australia for services to Australian literature in 2002.

Selected works

Poetry

Collections

Bald Hill with Gliders. Five Islands Press 1991
Halfway to Eden. Hale & Ironmonger 1996
Of the Stone: New and Selected Poems.  Five Islands Press 2000
Where the Heart Is. Picaro Press 2009
Postcards from the Centre. Profile Poetry 2010
Grace Notes and other poems. PIcaro Press 2012
What the Afternoon Knows. Pitt Street Poetry 2013

Poems 
"What the house knows" (2014)

Non-fiction
Creating Poetry.  Five Islands Press 1987, 2001
Nicole: another chance at life. (with Kaye Bowden). Five Islands Press 1993
Practical Poetics. Five Islands Press 2003

As editor
Outlook: an anthology of poems for senior students. Longman Cheshire 1992
Anthology of the Illawarra. Five Islands Press 1994
Cry Out! An anthology of street poetry (with Ann Davis). Five Islands Press 1996
The Argument from Desire: the 1999 Newcastle Prize Anthology. Five Islands Press 1999
Blue Like Tea: an anthology of poems from the Wollongong workshop. Five Islands Press 2000
Wild About the Roof. Wollongong Poetry Workshop 2001
Poems for all Occasions. Five Islands Press 2002
Two Spaces of Poetry: poems from Australia & West Bengal 2006
The Road South: an anthology of contemporary Australian poetry. Kolkata: Bengal Creations 2007

Reviews

Reviews for Ron Pretty's most recent book, What the Afternoon Knows  include:
 John Upton in Cordite Poetry Review: "He’s on top of his craft, shrewdly observant, witty, practical rather than flashy, never tired." 
 Les Wicks in the Rochford Street Review: "...there is a deep humanity in his observations and as you would expect, the deft hand of a master craftsman." 
 Geoff Page in the Canberra Times: "...it’s refreshing to read a collection where the poems are direct and emotionally engaged, while still possessing the linguistic and intellectual subtlety we rightly demand of poetry."

References

1940 births
Living people
Australian poets
Meanjin people
Members of the Order of Australia